In the Line of Duty is a series of girls with guns feature films produced by Hong Kong movie studio D & B Films which star, in the first two, Michelle Yeoh and, in subsequent instalments, Cynthia Khan as a Hong Kong Police Force officer who combines use of firearms with Kickboxing. The third was the first to use the In the Line of Duty title, retroactively applied to the two Michelle Yeoh vehicles.

Due to the entries being thematically rather than narratively related and their varying titles and release order in different territories and formats, what is considered part of the series and which number of it is open to debate. One wide interpretation is, in order of original release:
 Yes, Madam! (皇家師姐, 1985) a.k.a. Police Assassins 2 or II (UK VHS), Police Assassins (UK DVD, AU DVD); co-starring Cynthia Rothrock
 Royal Warriors (皇家戰士, 1986) a.k.a. Police Assassins (UK VHS); co-starring Hiroyuki Sanada and Michael Wong
 In the Line of Duty III (皇家師姐III 雌雄大盗, 1988) a.k.a. Force of the Dragon (UK VHS); co-starring Hiroshi Fujioka
 In the Line of Duty 4 (皇家師姐IV 直擊証人, 1989) a.k.a. In the Line of Duty (UK); co-starring Donnie Yen
 Middle Man (皇家師姐伍 中間人, 1990) a.k.a. In the Line of Duty V: Middle Man (USA); co-starring David Wu and Elvina Kong
 Forbidden Arsenal (地下兵工廠, 1991); a.k.a. In the Line of Duty 6: Forbidden Arsenal; co-starring Waise Lee 
 Sea Wolves (海狼, 1991); starring Gary Chau and Simon Yam
 Yes, Madam '92: A Serious Shock (末路狂花, 1992, a.k.a. Death Triangle): A return to the series with Moon Lee and Cynthia Khan.
 Yes Madam 5 (危情追蹤, 1995, a.k.a. Red Force 5)

References 

Action film series
Film series introduced in 1985
Hong Kong film series